Alfie Charles Plant (born 6 July 1992) is an English professional golfer. He came to prominence by winning the Silver Medal, as the leading amateur, at the 2017 Open Championship.

Amateur career
Plant was runner-up at the 2015 English Amateur at Alwoodley Golf Club, Leeds losing 9&7 to Joe Dean in the 36 hole final.

Plant played for England in the 2016 Eisenhower Trophy were the team finished second, their best ever finish in the event. Later in 2016 he won the Lytham Trophy with a score of 284 to win by seven shots.

Plant won the 2017 European Amateur at Walton Heath Golf Club. Plant was tied with two Italians, Luca Cianchetti and Lorenzo Scalise, on 273 after 72 holes. After a three-hole playoff, Plant and Scalise were still tied, but Plant finally won with a birdie at the fifth extra hole. His European Amateur win earned him entry into the 2017 Open Championship, his first start in a major championship. At the Open, he had opening rounds of 71 and 73 and was the only amateur to make the cut. He had further rounds of 69 and 73 and won the Silver Medal as the leading amateur.

Professional career
Plant turned professional after playing in the 2017 Walker Cup. In 2019 he won the Golfcatcher Championship on the PGA EuroPro Tour. He finished the 2019 PGA EuroPro Tour season 4th in the Order of Merit to gain a place on the 2020 Challenge Tour.

Amateur wins
2012 Waterford Trophy
2013 Kent Amateur Championship
2016 Lytham Trophy
2017 European Amateur

Source:

Professional wins (3)

Challenge Tour wins (2)

Challenge Tour playoff record (1–0)

PGA EuroPro Tour wins (1)

Results in major championships

LA = Low amateur
"T" = tied for place

Team appearances
Amateur
European Amateur Team Championship (representing England): 2016, 2017
St Andrews Trophy (representing Great Britain and Ireland): 2016 (tie)
Eisenhower Trophy (representing England): 2016
Walker Cup (representing Great Britain & Ireland): 2017

Source:

References

External links

English male golfers
People from Bexleyheath
1995 births
Living people